Countess Christiane of Erbach (5 June 1596 – 6 July 1646), was a countess from the  and through marriage Countess of Nassau-Siegen.

Biography

Christiane was born on 5 June 1596 as the daughter of Count George III of Erbach and Countess Mary of Barby and Mühlingen. Christiane’s older half-brother from her mother’s side, Count Christian of Waldeck-Wildungen, was married in November 1604 to Elisabeth of Nassau-Siegen, William’s eldest sister.

After the end of the Twelve Years’ Truce in 1621, William entered the service of the Dutch States Army, where he was appointed colonel of the infantry on 24 July 1622. Henceforth the county of Nassau-Siegen had two governments, one in Siegen, the other in Hilchenbach. Christiane and William lived in Siegen until 1625. In 1625 William became governor of Emmerich and from 1626 to 1637 he was governor of Heusden. In April 1633 he was appointed field marshal as successor of his uncle Count Ernest Casimir of Nassau-Diez. In 1637 William became governor of Sluis. On 17 June 1638 he suffered a considerable loss of 2,000 men, including his son Maurice Frederick, in the Battle of Calloo. William died at Orsoy on 7/17 July 1642 and was buried at Heusden on 24 July 1642. He left his part of the county of Nassau-Siegen to his half-brother John Maurice. As field marshal of the Dutch States Army, he was succeeded by his brother-in-law .

Count William Frederick of Nassau-Diez, the stadtholder of Friesland, noted in June 1645 in his diary that Christiane’s youngest daughter, sixteen-year-old Wilhelmine Christine, was the favourite girlfriend of Prince William II of Orange, ‘die hij zoo dicwils custe als hij woude, alleen sijnde, en de borstjes tastede’ (‘whom he kissed as much as he wished, being alone, and touching the breasts’). William II had to promise Wilhelmine Christine ‘sich deechlijck te hauden’ (‘to stay decent’), but the consequence of this intimacy was that Christiane did not want her daughter to be alone with Prince William, ‘doch dat sie het allebeide sochten’ (‘but that they both sought it’). When Christiane came in ‘maeckte prins Wilhelm den slaepert’ (‘Prince William sneaked out’).

Christiane died in Culemborg on 6 July 1646. She was buried in Heusden.

Issue
From the marriage of Christiane and William, the following children were born:
 John William (Siegen Castle, 28 October 1619 – Siegen Castle, 25 August 1623Jul.).
 Maurice Frederick (Siegen Castle, 19 January 1621 – Calloo, 17 June 1638), was a captain in the Dutch States Army, was killed in the Battle of Calloo.
 Mary Magdalene (Siegen Castle, 21 October 1622 – Spa, 20/30 August 1647), married in Culemborg on 25 August 1639 to Count Philip Theodore of Waldeck-Eisenberg (2 November 1614 – Korbach, 7 December 1645).
 Ernestine Juliane (Siegen, 17/27 July 1624 – Heusden, 9 July 1634).
 Elisabeth Charlotte (Emmerich, 11 March 1626 – Culemborg, 16 November 1694Jul.), married in Culemborg on 29 November/9 December 1643 to Fürst George Frederick of Waldeck-Eisenberg (Arolsen, 31 January 1620Jul. – Arolsen, 9 November 1692Jul.).
 Hollandine (Heusden, 2 March 1628 – Heusden, 14 October 1629).
 Wilhelmine Christine (1629 – Hildburghausen, 22 January 1700), married at Arolsen Castle on 26 January 1660 to Count Josias II of Waldeck-Wildungen (Wildungen, 31 July 1636 – Kandia, 8 August 1669).

One of the daughters from this marriage was engaged to Count Crato of Nassau-Saarbrücken.

Known descendants
Christiane has several known descendants. Among them are:
 the German Emperors Wilhelm I, Frederick III and Wilhelm II,
 the monarchs George IV, William IV, Victoria, Edward VII, George V, Edward VIII, George VI, Elizabeth II and Charles III of the United Kingdom,
 the kings Leopold I, Leopold II, Albert I, Leopold III, Baudouin I, Albert II and Philippe I of the Belgians.
 the tsars Ferdinand I, Boris III and Simeon II of Bulgaria.
 the kings Ferdinand II, Pedro V, Luís I, Carlos I and Manuel II of Portugal,
 the grand dukes Adolph I, William IV, Marie-Adélaïde, Charlotte, Jean I and Henri I of Luxembourg,
 the Romanian writer Carmen Sylva.

Ancestors

Notes

References

Sources
 
 
 
 
  (1911). "Willem, Wilhelm". In:  en  (redactie), Nieuw Nederlandsch Biografisch Woordenboek (in Dutch). Vol. Eerste deel. Leiden: A.W. Sijthoff. p. 1572.
 
 
 
 
 
 
 
 
 
 ;  (1999). "Johan Wolfert van Brederode 1599–1655 – ʻIn Opbloey neergetoghenʼ". In:  e.a. (red.), Johan Wolfert van Brederode 1599–1655. Een Hollands edelman tussen Nassau en Oranje (in Dutch). Vianen: Historische Vereniging Het Land van Brederode/Zutphen: Uitgeversmaatschappij Walburg Pers. p. 9–46. .
 
 
 
 
 
 
 
 
 
 
  (1882). Het vorstenhuis Oranje-Nassau. Van de vroegste tijden tot heden (in Dutch). Leiden: A.W. Sijthoff/Utrecht: J.L. Beijers.

External links
 Nassau. In: Medieval Lands. A prosopography of medieval European noble and royal families, compiled by Charles Cawley.
 Nassau Part 5. In: An Online Gotha, by Paul Theroff.

|-

Erbach, Christiane
Erbach, Christiane
House of Erbach
Countesses of Nassau
∞
Erbach, Christiane
Erbach, Christiane
Erbach, Christiane